In Live Concert at the Royal Albert Hall is a live double album by Swedish progressive metal band Opeth. The DVD was recorded on 5 April 2010. It was released on 20 September 2010 in Europe and on 21 September 2010 in the rest of the world. The concert was part of the band's Evolution XX: An Opeth Anthology tour, made in celebration of their 20th anniversary, and was the fourth show of the tour, filmed at the prestigious Royal Albert Hall in London, UK.

Release
The album is available in three configurations: one double-DVD including bonus features; a five-disc set that consists of two DVDs and three CDs; and a limited-edition vinyl box set which consists of the double-DVD, a set of four 180-gram LPs of the concert's live audio in its entirety, a numbered lithograph with artwork designed by the band's frontman Mikael Åkerfeldt and Travis Smith, and a 20-page booklet of photos of the event and exclusive artwork.

The concert performance was split into two sets for the DVD. The first set consists of the entire Blackwater Park album, while the second features one song from each of their other albums in chronological order, representing the twenty years of evolution in the band's music.

Cover art
The cover art is purposely similar to that of Deep Purple's Concerto for Group and Orchestra, which was recorded at the same venue in 1969, "underlining the band's longstanding love for their prog-rock roots".

Trivia
At some point during "The Lotus Eater", a camera man stepped on the power cord to Fredrik Åkesson's guitar amplifier, resulting in no sound coming out from Åkesson's guitar. This moment was kept on the recording.

Track listing

DVD

CD

Personnel
 Mikael Åkerfeldt − guitar, vocals, mixing, direction
 Fredrik Åkesson − guitars, backing vocals
 Martín Méndez − bass guitar
 Per Wiberg − keyboards, backing vocals
 Martin "Axe" Axenrot – drums

Charts

References

Opeth albums
Roadrunner Records live albums
Roadrunner Records video albums
2010 video albums
2010 live albums
Live video albums
Live albums recorded at the Royal Albert Hall
Albums produced by Jens Bogren